Trinh T. Minh-ha (born 1952 in Hanoi; Vietnamese: Trịnh Thị Minh Hà) is a Vietnamese filmmaker, writer, literary theorist, composer, and professor. She has been making films for over thirty years and may be best known for her films [[Reassemblage (film)|Reassemblage']]', made in 1982, and Surname Viet Given Name Nam, made in 1985. She has received several awards and grants, including the American Film Institute's National Independent Filmmaker Maya Deren Award, and Fellowships from the John Simon Guggenheim Foundation, the National Endowment for the Arts and the California Arts Council. Her films have been the subject of twenty retrospectives.

She is currently Professor of Gender & Women's Studies and Rhetoric at the University of California, Berkeley. She teaches courses that focus on gender politics as related to cultural politics, post-coloniality, contemporary critical theory and the arts. The seminars she offers focus on critical theory and research, cultural politics, feminist theory, Third cinema, film theory and aesthetics, the Voice in social and creative contexts, and the autobiographical.

Her Vietnamese heritage as well as years of her life spent in West Africa, Japan, and the United States have informed Trinh's work, particularly her focus on cultural politics. While she does not locate herself as primarily Asian or American she also situates herself within "this whole context of Asia whose cultural heritages cut across national borderlines." The conceptualization of cultural heritages that transgress borderlines is one that continues to inform her work as both a filmmaker and a literary theorist.

Biography
Trinh T. Minh-ha was born in Hanoi, Vietnam. She was brought up in South Vietnam during the Vietnam War. Among other educational trajectories, she studied piano and music composition at the National Conservatory of Music and Theater in Saigon. Trinh migrated to the United States in 1970.

She studied music composition, ethnomusicology, and French literature at the University of Illinois Urbana-Champaign, where she received her Ph.D. degree.

She has been a professor in the Gender and Women's Studies Department at the University of California, Berkeley since 1994 and in the Department of Rhetoric since 1997. She has also taught at Harvard, Smith, Cornell, San Francisco State University, the University of Illinois, Ochanomizu University in Japan, and the National Conservatory of Music in Senegal.

 Literary theory 
Trinh's work in literary theory is one that defies national borders and resists singular definitions. She focuses on the themes of transcultural interactions, transitions, the production and perception of difference, and the intersection of technology and colonization. The influence that technology and cyberspace have had on the "making and unmaking of identity"  has been the focus of her more recent works. For Trinh, the concept of "elsewhere" (the subject for her 2010 book) intersects with the idea of the "inappropriate/d other." Although she coined this term in the eighties, the "inappropriate/d other" continues to factor in her work, as both a filmmaker and critic due to its focus on liminal subjecthood.

As a Vietnamese living in the United States with a diverse diasporic intellectual position, she tells us how hard it is to find an authentic voice for the Other, since all subjectivities are formed in discourse and shaped by the power and knowledge of discourse. The truth of experience can't simply be told; instead, the discourse itself that produces truth must be questioned.

 Lovecidal (2016) Lovecidal, Trinh's most recent book published in July, 2016, offers a lyrical, philosophical meditation on the global state of endless war from U.S. military intervention in Iraq and Afghanistan to China's annexation of Tibet to racial turmoil in the United States and focuses on the shifting dynamics of people's' resistance to acts of militarism and surveillance as well as social media and its capacity to inform and mobilize citizens around the world. The book focuses on what Trinh describes as 'the transient line between winning and losing', where conflicts are muddied and victories are neither clear nor objective, and the only clear victor is war itself. Though the 'illness' of global militarism and the need to claim victory continues to thrive, potent forms of dissent have risen to confront it, empowering the seemingly powerless to claim 'victories' of their own.

 Elsewhere, Within Here: Immigration Refugeeism and the Boundary Event (2010) Elsewhere, Within Here is a collection of essays which examines the potentialities in the intervals between various spaces that interrupt boundaries and discursive dichotomies in productive ways. Trinh focuses on lived experience, social contexts, and embodied histories, in order to draw attention to the hybridities that exist at various boundary events and the illuminate dynamic similarities and interconnections in seemingly disparate spaces.

Part I, "The Traveling Source." explores notions of home, migration, and belonging through an embodied experience of history, context, and ultimately hybridity.

Part II, "Boundary Event: Between Refuse and Refuge," focuses on the politics of representation, multiple ways of knowing, and the possibilities that emerge through performance and other forms of creativity.

Part III, "No End in Sight" illustrates the reproduction of systems of power and oppression, along with possibilities that enable their disruption, including creativity, storytelling, and learning.

 When the Moon Waxes Red (1991) When the Moon Waxes Red: Representation, Gender and Cultural Politics challenges patriarchal ideologies and feminist resistance to expand its terms to a multiply-marginalized subject. This collection of essays describes the position of a multi-hyphenated subject whose liminal and shifting existence should be used to disrupt and exceed existing ideology. The essays revolve around film theory, feminism, and Third World artists and critics. In the first section of the essays, Trinh critiques the tradition of documentary and its deceptive practices. She argues that documentaries about Third World countries exist to propagate a first-world, subjective truth. The film positions the documenters against the interviewees, creating a power dynamic in which the latter is made to depend on the former in order for their voices heard. Often, orientalism and patriarchy appear obscured in documentaries even while continuing to operate. In the second section of essays, Trinh questions other theorists and artists for confining the multi-hyphenated subject to certain categories. However, she also conceptualizes an interstitial space in which feminists of color can produce theory and criticism that questions traditional gender and race politics. She posits that subjects in this interstitial space should be able to produce new modes of thinking without recirculating previous positions of power. It is in this space that the Third World critic is simultaneously part of the culture and an outside observer of the culture. The critic in this space now must be able to produce new representations of ideology without falling on hegemonic ones. However, Trinh's own work must answer the same question of how one can create without circulating dominant ideology. In the third section of essays, she advocates for a non-binary opposition of politics against dominant ideology. Trinh warns the reader to "solicit and sharpen awareness of how ideological patriarchy and hegemony work," especially when some artifacts still remain even with new representations of ideology.

 Woman, Native, Other: Writing Postcoloniality and Feminism (1989) 
In Woman, Native, Other Trinh focuses her work on oral tradition – family, herself, and her culture. In this approach, Trinh asserts a people's theory that is more inclusive. This method opened up an avenue for women of color to critique theory while creating new ways of "knowing" that are different than standard academic theory. Trinh proposes to the reader to unlearn received knowledge and ways of structuring reality. In Chapter 1 she explores questions of language, writing, and oral tradition. She suggests being critical against "well-written," and knowing the difference between a "written-woman" and a "writing-woman.42" In the second chapter Trinh repudiates Western and male constructions of knowledge through anthropology. She argues that anthropology is the root of western male hegemonic ideology that attempts to create a discourse of human truth. Mixed in with her stories and critiques are photographic images of women of color from Trinh's work in film. She includes stories of many other women of color such as Audre Lorde, Nellie Wong, and Gloria Anzaldua to increase the ethnic and semiotic geography of her work, and to also show a non-binary approach that problematizes the difficulty of representing a diverse "other." Woman, Native, Other, in its inclusive narrative and varied style attempt to show how binary oppositions work to support patriarchal/hegemonic ideology and how to approach it differently to avoid it.

 Critical approach between writing and film 
Trinh T. Minh-ha does not view the process of writing and filmmaking to be inherently different, thinking "more in terms of processes of transformation" than of actual messages. Rather, the message is delivered of the course of creating a work. This is clear when examining published works such as D-Passage, which combines elements of literary theory alongside her films and screenplays.

Films

Reassemblage (40 mins, 1982)Reassemblage (sometimes listed as Re:assemblage) is Trinh T. Minh-ha's first 16mm film. It was filmed in Senegal and released in 1982. In Reassemblage, Minh-ha explains that she intends "not to speak about/Just speak nearby," unlike more conventional ethnographic documentary film. The film is a montage of fleeting images from Senegal and includes no narration, although there are occasional statements by Trinh T. Minh-ha. None of the statements given by her assign meaning to the scenes. There is music, silence, sometimes Trinh views a movie, refusing to make the film "about" a "culture". It points to the viewers expectation and the need for the assignment of meaning.

Naked Spaces: Living is Round (135 mins, 1985)
In Naked Spaces: Living Is Round, Trinh T. Minh-ha elaborates on Reassemblage. She examines the themes of postcolonial identification and the geopolitical apparatus of disempowerment in Reassemblage to create an ethnographic essay-film on identity, the impossibility of translation, and space as a form of cultural representation. She re-frames the images in order to establish a figurative filter - a usurped privileged gaze. The montage of images point towards the economy of entertainment, which exoticizes images; exploited by the international community as justification for continued neocolonialism. Trinh's images re-present struggle and resistance to the mystification and exoticization of African life. Her images suggest a process of interpretation as an explanation to resist prescribed assumptions and the perpetuation of stereotypes, as it is announced in the opening statement, "Not descriptive, not informative, not interesting."

Surname Viet Given Name Nam (108 mins, 1989)Surname Viet Given Name Nam is not made in Vietnam. The film is composed of newsreel and archival footage as well as printed information and features interviews with five contemporary Vietnamese women living in the US, as well as "staged interviews" with the same women reciting English language translations of interviews (originally published in French) with women in Vietnam. According to Trinh, the film "allows the practice of interviews to enter into the play of the true and the false, and the real and the staged." By showing both the staged and the "real" interviews, the film demarcates the differences between the two and thereby addresses the invisibility of the politics of interviews and of representations generally. The film asks the viewer to consider issues such as plural identity, the fictions inherent in documentary techniques, and film as translation. Surname Viet, Given Name Nam, has received much attention, including winning the Blue Ribbon Award at the American Film and Video festival.

Shoot for the Contents (102 mins, 1991)Shoot for the Content refers in part to a Chinese guessing game. It is a unique maze of allegorical naming and storytelling in China. The film ponders questions of power and change, politics and culture, stemming from events at Tiananmen Square. The title juggles with documentary concepts of getting to the truth: "Shoot for the contents". Simultaneously, it questions the film itself, "guess what's in this film." The film inquires into the process of film-making. The film is delicately layered with Chinese popular songs, classical music, sayings of Mao and Confucius, women's voices, words of artists, philosophers, and other workers. The multifaceted layering of images and sounds once again touch on themes Trinh addresses in earlier film (Surname Viet Given Name Nam) on the multiplicity of identity, and the politics of representation, in this case, re-presentations of China. The film's delicate balance between omission and depiction and its play with colors, rhythm, and the changing relationship between ear and eye suggest shifts of interpretation in contemporary Chinese culture and politics. This film won Trinh the Excellence in Cinematography Award in 1992.

A Tale of Love (108 mins, 1995) (fiction)

Trinh T. Minh-ha's tenth film, A Tale of Love is loosely based on the Vietnamese epic poem The Tale of Kieu, a national love poem written in the 19th century that follows the misfortunes of Thúy Kiều, a talented, young woman who sacrificed her "purity" by prostituting herself to save her family. The poem has been widely regarded as a metaphor for the often-invaded Vietnam. The film tells the story of Vietnamese immigrant Kieu, a freelance writer who is struggling between the conflicting demands of a new life in America, the family she left behind and her own ambitions. This was Minh-ha's first feature-length film shot in 35mm.

The Fourth Dimension (87 mins, digital, 2001)The Fourth Dimensionhttp://www.filmref.com/notes/archives/2006/01/the_fourth_dimension_2001.html  is Trinh T. Minh-ha's first digital video feature. It is an exploration of time through rituals of new technology, daily life, and what is understood as conventional ritual, including festivals, religious rites, and theatrical performances. The film brings the viewers to a recognition that "in the end" "what is sensually brought on-screen" is not "Japan, but the expansive reality of Japan as an image and as time-light." Here, travel through Japan is through a camera, a travelogue of images, where a visual machine ritualizes the journey. The images that come alive in time also frame time in the film; this is where the actual and virtual meet- The Fourth Dimension. In the process of ritualizing the images of "rituals of Japan" it is an encounter between self and other, human and machine, viewer and image, fact and fancy, the nexus at which the past and present are made possible.

Night Passage (98mins, digital, 2004) (fiction)Night Passage is an experimental, lyrical digital feature. Inspired by Kenji Miyazawa's Milky Way Railroad, it follows three young friends as they travel on a train between life and death. Continuing Minh-ha's thematic interest in framing, she and co-director and producer Jean Paul Bourdier explore the experience of dreamscapes through the train window. As with The Fourth Dimension, Minh-ha explains her interest in digital production as a matter of engagement with speed and new ways of seeing. As she said in conversation with Elizabeth Dungan, "… the question is not so much to produce a new image as to provoke, to facilitate, and to solicit a new seeing… Speed at its best in digital imaging is still speed." Throughout Night Passage, Minh-ha and Bourdier meditate on liminal spaces and identities as well as processes of digital cinema.

 Forgetting Vietnam (90 mins, digital, 2015) Forgetting Vietnam, is a lyrical essay that combines myths, performance, images of contemporary Vietnamese life, and explorations of cultural re-memory. Building off the elements that form the Vietnamese term "country" as existing between land and water, Forgetting Vietnam explores how local inhabitants, immigrants, and veterans understand and remember. A developing, ongoing conversation between myth and the 40th anniversary of the Vietnam War proceeds throughout the film. The film was shot in 1995 on HI-8 and in 2012 in both HD and SD video. The editing together of these two different formats works within the film to question the concepts of linear time and "progress."

 What About China? (135 mins, 2022) What About China? is an essayistic reflection on rich and complex history of China and also of the film medium. Trinh T. Minh-ha in this film goes back to the materials she shot in the southern and eastern China in the early 1990s. Instead of searching for the “true” China, What About China? is  a question posed to delve beneath the surface of our everyday assumptions about the country which are mostly based on the media coverage and official narratives.

PublicationsUn art sans oeuvre, ou, l'anonymat dans les arts contemporains (International Book Publishers, Inc., 1981)African Spaces - Designs for Living in Upper Volta (in coll. with Jean-Paul Bourdier, Holmes & Meier, 1985)En minuscules (book of poems, Edition Le Meridien, 1987)Woman, Native, Other. Writing postcoloniality and feminism (Indiana University Press, 1989)
German Edition: trans. Kathrina Menke, Vienna & Berlin: Verlag Turia & Kant, 2010.
Japanese Edition: trans. Kazuko Takemura, Tokyo: Iwanami Shoten, 1995.Out There: Marginalisation in Contemporary Culture (co-editor with Cornel West, R. Ferguson & M. Gever. New Museum of Contemporary Art and M.I.T. Press, 1990)When the Moon Waxes Red. Representation, gender and cultural politics (Routledge, 1991)
Japanese Edition : trans. Fukuko Kobayashi, Tokyo: Misuzu Publishers, 1996.Framer Framed (Routledge, 1992)Drawn from African Dwellings (in coll. with Jean-Paul Bourdier, Indiana University Press, 1996)Cinema Interval (Routledge, 1999)Trinh T. Minh-ha / Secession (Secession, 2001)The Digital Film Event (Routledge, 2005)Habiter un monde (in coll. with Jean-Paul Bourdier, Editions Alternatives, 2005)
English Edition: Vernacular Architecture in West Africa: A World in Dwelling (in coll. with Jean-Paul Bourdier, Routledge, 2011)Elsewhere, Within Here: Immigration, Refugeeism and the Boundary Event (Routledge, 2011)
Swedish Edition: Nagon annanstans, har inne (Translated by Goran Dahlberg and Elin Talji; Glänta, 2012)
Japanese Edition: trans. Fukuko Kobayashi. Tokyo: Heibonsha Ltd., 2013.D-Passage: The Digital Way (Duke University Press, 2013)Lovecidal: Walking with the Disappeared'' (Fordham University Press, 2016)

Installations
Old Land New Waters (2007, Prefecture Museum and museum of Fine Arts of Okinawa, Japan; 2008, Chechnya Emergency Biennale; 2008, Third Guangzhou Art Triennale; 2009, Prefecture Museum and museum of Fine Arts of Okinawa, Japan)
L'Autre marche (in coll. with Jean-Paul Bourdier, 2006, Musée du Quai Branly)
Bodies of the Desert (2005, Gallery Blu, Santa Clara)
The Desert is Watching (in coll. with Jean-Paul Bourdier, 2003, Kyoto Art Biennale)
Nothing But Ways (in coll. with Lynn Marie Kirby, 1999, Yerba Buena Center for the Arts, San Francisco)
Photo-montage (1995, San Francisco State University)

Music
Poems. Composition for Percussion Ensemble. Premiere by the Univ. of Illinois Percussion Ensemble, Denis Wiziecki, Director. 9 April 1976.
Four Pieces for Electronic Music. 1975 Performances at the Univ. of Illinois.

References

External links 

Trinh T. Minh-ha at Women Make Movies
Trinh Minh-ha's reading of Forces and Forms (Between the Deleuzian Middle and the Chinese Pictorial Arts) on the 'Lectures with Lindsay' audio collection

1952 births
Academics of Vietnamese descent
American documentary filmmakers
American women writers
American writers of Vietnamese descent
American experimental filmmakers
Harvard University faculty
Smith College faculty
Cornell University faculty
Academic staff of Ochanomizu University
Living people
People from Hanoi
San Francisco State University faculty
Minh-ha, Trinh T.
Vietnamese academics
Vietnamese emigrants to the United States
Vietnamese film directors
Vietnamese women film directors
Vietnamese writers
Vietnamese experimental filmmakers
Writers of Vietnamese descent
Postcolonial theorists
Critical theorists
Poststructuralists
American film directors
American feminist writers
Postmodern feminists
20th-century American writers
21st-century American writers
21st-century Vietnamese women writers
20th-century Vietnamese women writers
20th-century Vietnamese writers
American women documentary filmmakers
Women experimental filmmakers
English-language literature of Vietnam